Mangiante is an Italian surname. Notable people with the surname include:

Andrea Mangiante (born 1976), Italian water polo player
Giovanni Mangiante (1893–1967), Italian gymnast
Lorenzo Mangiante (1891–1936), Italian gymnast

Italian-language surnames